Sir Robert Edward Graham Shillington CBE (2 April 1911 – 14 August 2001) was a senior Northern Irish police officer. He served as Chief Constable of Royal Ulster Constabulary from 1970 to 1973.

Early life
Shillington was born on 2 April 1911 in Portadown, Ireland. He was the youngest of six children born to Major David Graham Shillington, who went on to become a Member of the Parliament of Northern Ireland. He was educated at Castle Park School, a prep school in Dublin, Ireland, and Sedbergh School a public boarding school in Yorkshire, England. He then attended Clare College, University of Cambridge where he studied natural sciences. He graduated Bachelor of Arts (BA) in 1932.

Police career
Shillington had originally planned to join the Civil Service, however he wanted a more varied career. He joined the Royal Ulster Constabulary on 8 February 1933 as a cadet officer. He completed his training at the Newtownards depot in County Down. He was promoted to district inspector in 1935, and served as officer in charge of D District in Belfast. In 1944, he was promoted to 1st Class District Inspector and was posted to Derry.

In 1953, after nine years in Derry, he was promoted to County Inspector and returned to Belfast. There, he joined the Inspector General's Headquarters and served in an administrative post. On 16 January 1961, he was appointed Commissioner of Belfast City.

Honours and decorations
In the 1952 New Year Honours, Shillington was appointed Member of the Order of the British Empire (MBE). He was promoted to Officer of the Order of the British Empire (OBE) in the 1959 Queen's Birthday Honours.
He was knighted in the 1972 Queen's Birthday Honours List.

References

 
 
 

1911 births
2001 deaths
Knights Bachelor
Chief Constables of the Royal Ulster Constabulary
People from Portadown
People educated at Sedbergh School
Commanders of the Order of the British Empire